The Wolfson History Prizes are literary awards given annually in the United Kingdom to promote and encourage standards of excellence in the writing of history for the general public.  Prizes are given annually for two or three exceptional works published during the year, with an occasional oeuvre prize (a general award for an individual's distinguished contribution to the writing of history). They are awarded and administered by the Wolfson Foundation, with winning books being chosen by a panel of judges composed of eminent historians.

In order to qualify for consideration, a book must be published in the United Kingdom and the author must be a British subject at the time the award is made and normally resident in the UK.  Books should be readable and scholarly and be accessible to the lay reader. Prizes are awarded in the summer following the year of the books' publication; however, until 1987 prizes were awarded at the end of the competition year.

Established in 1972 by the Wolfson Foundation, a UK charitable foundation, they were originally known as the Wolfson Literary Awards.

Honourees

1970s

1980s

1990s

2000s

2010s 
Awards after 2016 have a winner and shortlist of five.

2020s

List of winners of the Oeuvre Prize
 2005 – Christopher Bayly
 2002 – Roy Jenkins
 2000 – Asa Briggs
 1997 – Eric Hobsbawm
 1982 – Steven Runciman
 1981 – Owen Chadwick
 1978 – Howard Colvin

See also

 List of history awards
 Alan Ball Local History Awards
 The Whitfield Prize
 Wolfson family

Notes

References

External links 
 Wolfson History Prize website

1972 establishments in the United Kingdom
Awards established in 1972
British literary awards
History awards